The Asaf Jahi was a Muslim dynasty that ruled the Hyderabad State. The family came to India in the late 17th century and became employees of the Mughal Empire. They were great patrons of Persian culture, language, and literature, and the family found ready patronage.

The dynasty was founded by Mir Qamar-ud-Din Siddiqi, a Viceroy of the Deccan—(administrator of six Mughal governorates) under the Mughal emperors from 1713 to 1721. He intermittently ruled after Aurangzeb's death in 1707 and under the title Asaf Jah in 1724. The Mughal Empire crumbled and the Viceroy of the Deccan, Asaf Jah I, declared himself independent, whose domain extended from the Narmada river in the North to Trichinopoly in the South and Masulipatnam in the east to Bijapur in the west.

History
Nawab Khwaja Abid Siddiqi, the grandfather of the first Nizam, was born in Aliabad near Samarkhand in the kingdom of Bukhara in modern-day Uzbekistan. His father, Alam Shaik, was a well-known Sufi and celebrated man of letters. Khwaja Abid's mother was from the family of Mir Hamdan, a distinguished Syed of Samarkhand. The first Nizam's mother was the daughter of Sadullah Khan, the Grand vizier (1645-1656) of Mughal Emperor Shah Jahan.

After succeeding in the war of succession, Aurangzeb made him the Governor of Ajmer and subsequently of Multan with the title of Qalich Khan. He served the Emperor with distinction particularly during the early years of Aurangzeb's reign while he was consolidating and restoring peace in his newly acquired territory.

Asaf Jah I
  

The founder of this dynasty was Mir Qamaruddin Khan, a noble and a courtier of the Mughal Muhammad Shah, who negotiated a peace treaty with Nadirshah, the Iranian invader; got disgusted with the intrigues that prevailed in Delhi. He was on his way back to the Deccan, where, earlier he was a Subedar. But he had to confront Mubariz Khan, as a result of a plot by the Mughal emperor to kill the former. Mubariz Khan failed in his attempt and he was himself slain. This one on one took place in AD 1724, and henceforth Mir Qamaruddin, who assumed the title of Nizam-ul-Mulk, conducted himself as an independent ruler. Earlier, while he was one of the Ministers of the Mughal emperor Muhammad Shah, the latter conferred on him the title of Asaf Jah. Thus begins the Asaf Jahi rule over Golconda with the capital at Aurangabad.

Asaf Jah II

The fourth son of the Nizam-ul-Mulk, Nizam Ali Khan was born on 24 February 1734. He assumed the Subedari of the Deccan at the age of 28 years and ruled the Deccan for almost 42 years - the longest period among the Nizams. His reign was one of the most important chapters in the history of the Asaf Jahi dynasty. Among his efforts to consolidate the Nizam empire was the shift of the Deccan capital from Aurangabad to Hyderabad. He ruled the Deccan at a most critical period and got very successful support from the House of Paigah. He protected the Deccan from the attack of the Marathas and Tippu Sultan of Mysore by signing a mutual protection treaty with the British.

After a reign that played a pivotal role in the establishment of the Nizam dynasty, Nizam Ali Khan Siddiqi died in 1803 at the age of 69. He was buried at the Mecca Masjid alongside the tomb of his mother Umda Begum.

Asaf Jah III

Mir Akbar Ali Khan Siddiqi Sikander Jah, Asaf Jah III was born on 11 November 1768. After the death of Nizam Ali Khan, he became the Subedar Jah was ratified by the emperor Shah Alam II and also conferred all his father's titles on Sikander Jah.

Asaf Jah IV

Mir Farkhunda Ali Khan Siddiqi Nusir-ud-Dawlah was born in Bidar on 25 April 1794. He was the eldest son of Sikander Jah and after his father's death, he succeeded him on 23 May 1829. During the reign of his father, several of British officers were employed in several civil services. Hence on ascending the throne in 1829 one of the first acts of his highness was to request the Governor-general, Lord William Bentick to the European officers.

Asaf Jah V

Mir Tahniath Ali Khan Siddiqi Afzal-ud-daula was born on 11 October 1827. He was the eldest son of Nawab Nasir-ud-daula. He ascended the throne on 18 May 1857 and Indian mutiny was started on 17 July 1857 Rohillas attacked the residency but Sir Salar Jung put down the attack with a firm hand. Similarly, trouble started in Solapur but the Maharaja of Solapur was unable to control it.

Asaf Jah VI

Mir Mahboob Ali Khan was born on 17 August 1866. He was the only son of Nawab Afzal-ud-Daula Asaf Jah V. When his father died he was two years and seven months old. He was installed as the Munsab by Sir Salar Jung I, Nawab Rasheeduddin Khan, Shams ul Ummra and the residents, there functioned as the Reyab. Shar-ul-Ummul died on 12 December 1881 and Salar Jung become the sole regent. He was remembered as administrator and regent till his death.

He is popularly known for his efforts to abolish the practice of Sati and for having supernatural healing powers against Snakebite.

Asaf Jah VII

Mir Osman Ali Khan was born in Hyderabad on 5 April 1886 at Purani Haveli. Since he was the heir-apparent, great attention was paid to his education, and eminent scholars were engaged to teach him English, Urdu, Persian. On 14 April 1906, he married Dulhan Pasha Begum, daughter of Nawab Jahangir Jung, at Eden Bagh, at the age of 21.

He is credited for various reforms in education and development and remembered for being a truly secular King by giving yearly donations to various temples. He made large donations to educational institutions in India and abroad. He donated Rs 10 Lakh to the Banaras Hindu University and Rs 5 Lakh to the Aligarh Muslim University.

He set up the Osmania University, Osmania General Hospital, Osmania Medical College, State Bank of Hyderabad, South India's first airport -the Begumpet Airport, Nizamia Observatory, Government Nizamia General Hospital, etc.

The Nizam was reported to have fathered 34 children including 16 sons and 18 daughters

Others

Descendants of Asaf Jah VII
 Azam Jah, Prince of Berar, GCIE, GBE, MSM (21 February 1907 – 9 October 1970). Granted the title of His Highness the Prince of Berar (13 November 1936). Passed over in the line of succession in 1967 in favour of his elder son. He had two sons, the elder Mukarram Jah and the younger Muffakham Jah
 Moazzam Jah, second son of Asaf Jah VII.
 Barkat Ali Khan Mukarram Jah, Asaf Jah VIII, 8th (Titular) Nizam of Hyderabad (6 October 1933 - 14 January 2023). Succeeded his grandfather as a titular monarch on 24 January 1967; titles were abolished by the Indian Government on 28 December 1971. He had children that included two sons.
 Muhammad Azmat Ali Khan, Asaf Jah IX, 9th (Titular) Nizam of Hyderabad (23 July 1960 - ). Succeeded his father as titular monarch on 14 January 2023; titles were abolished by the Indian Government on 28 December 1971. He has a son, Murad Jah.
 Najaf Ali Khan - Grandson of 7th Nizam - known for being a Hyderabad Heritage enthusiast, who has also criticized the Government of Telangana regarding the negligence of several heritage structures and hospitals built by the 7th Nizam.

Asaf Jahi rulers of Hyderabad

Nasir Jung, Muzaffar Jung and Salabat Jung:- * These three rulers are not enumerated in the order of the Asaf Jah's, mainly because they were not granted the title of ASAF JAH by the Mughal Emperor.

Titular

Family tree

See also
 Hyderabad State
 Nizam of Hyderabad
 National Anthem of Kingdom of Hyderabad
 Paigah
 Salar Jung family
 List of Sunni Muslim dynasties

References

External links
 
 Hyderabad History 

1724 establishments in India
1948 disestablishments in India
 
Dynasties of India
History of Telangana
People from Hyderabad State
Nawabs of India
Royal titles
Titles in India
Titles of national or ethnic leadership
Asian royal families